Irene Tupuna (born 1959) also known as Matangaro Tupuna is an international lawn bowler from the Cook Islands.

Bows career
Tupuna won the bronze medal in the triples at the 2007 Asia Pacific Bowls Championships in Christchurch.

She has been selected to represent the Cook Islands at two Commonwealth Games; the singles at the 2010 Commonwealth Games and the triples and fours at the 2014 Commonwealth Games.

References

1959 births
Living people
Bowls players at the 2010 Commonwealth Games
Bowls players at the 2014 Commonwealth Games
Commonwealth Games competitors for the Cook Islands
Cook Island female bowls players